Sam Sanders (born March 19, 1938) is a former American football player and coach.  He served as the head football coach at Alfred University from 1977 to 1984 and at the University at Buffalo, The State University of New York from 1990 to 1991, compiling a career college football record of 54–42–2.

Head coaching record

References

1938 births
Living people
Alfred Saxons football coaches
Buffalo Bulls football coaches
Buffalo Bulls football players
Lehigh Mountain Hawks football coaches
Northern Illinois Huskies football coaches
Toronto Argonauts coaches